Ayang Tulku Rinpoche is a Tibetan Buddhist lama.

Life

Ayang Tulku Rinpoche (born 1942) was born in a nomadic family in Eastern Tibet and holds both Drikung and Nyingma lineages. The young boy was recognised by a delegation of high lamas, including the 16th Gyalwang Karmapa, Ayang Drubchen Tenpai Nyinpa, Nelong Drubchen, Traleg Kyagbon, and the tutor of Drikung Kyobgon Chabra Rinpoche, as the mind (wisdom) emanation of Terton Rigzin Chögyal Dorje and the seventh incarnation of the founder of the Ayang Monastery in Eastern Tibet (Kham), which was built around 1580 C.E. as a branch of the main Drikung monastery. 
He took his monk's vows and received his early training at Drikung Thil Changchub Ling, the main Drikung Kagyu monastery in central Tibet. From 1951 to 1955 he studied at Drikung Nyima Changra Philosophical College in central Tibet. From Khenpo Tsense Sangpo he received all the Nyingthig initiations and teachings as well as his first Phowa teaching according to the Nyingma tradition. From the great Drikung lama Nyizong Tripa he received all the initiations of Rinchen Ter Dzod and Kagyu Nag Dzod. From his own monastery, Ayang Thupten Rinpoche, who was also the tutor of the head of the Drikung lineage, bestowed on him teachings of the Six Yogas of Naropa and Mahamudra. He received teachings on Drikung Phowa from both Drikung Kyobgon Chetsang Rinpoche and Drikung Kyobgon Chungsang Rinpoche, the heads of the Drikung lineage, during the Phowa Chenmo, which takes place only once every twelve years. He was given the Upadesha (pointing out instructions) by the great Nyingma yogi Rahor Chödra Rinpoche.

Work

Ayang Rinpoche is considered a foremost authority on Buddhist afterlife rituals and Tibetan Pure Land Buddhism; he gives teachings and initiations to the practice of phowa in Tibetan and English annually in Bodh Gaya, India and across the world in Europe, Asia, Australia and North America. He has established a school, medical clinic and education sponsorship program for children in Tibet and a variety of community development projects for Tibetans in India. He is also the founder of the Opame Khilkor Choling (The Amitabha Mandala Temple and Retreat Center) with 16 temples and a 64-cottage retreat center dedicated to Buddha Amitābha that overlooks the Kathmandu Valley in Nepal and Thupten Shedrub Jangchub Ling Monastic Institute at Bylakuppe, in the Indian State of Karnataka.

Vajrayana courses 
Chöje Ayang Rinpoche has been giving teachings around the world, at locations like Hong Kong, Paris, San Jose, Sydney, Taipei, Toronto, etc. Besides his famous Phowa courses, he has also been lecturing advanced Vajrayana courses like, but not limited to, Higher Level Buddha Vajrasattva teachings (wisdom treasure of Rigdzin Tsewang Norbu), Buddha Amitābha 10 levels teachings (Namchö tradition), and True Nature of Mind “pointing out” instructions.

Phowa Teachings Contents:

 Buddha Amitābha empowerment
 Nyingma phowa oral transmission, instructions and practice
 Drikung phowa oral transmission, instructions and practice
 Vajrasattva visualization and practice
 Buddha Amitābha Visualization
 Namcho Amitābha short sadhana practice
 Three excellence teachings
 Doing phowa for others at the moment of death
 Doing phowa for oneself at the moment of death
 Milarepa tsog offering prayers
 Amitābha tsog offering prayers

References

Pure Land Buddhism
Drikung Kagyu lamas
Nyingma lamas